James Michael Vesey (born May 26, 1993) is an American professional ice hockey left winger for the New York Rangers of the National Hockey League (NHL). He has previously played for the Buffalo Sabres, Toronto Maple Leafs, Vancouver Canucks and New Jersey Devils. He was selected by the Nashville Predators in the third round, 66th overall, of the 2012 NHL Entry Draft. Vesey won the Hobey Baker Award in 2016.

Playing career

College
Vesey played four years with Harvard University in the NCAA. The North Reading, Massachusetts native finished his collegiate career with 144 points (80 goals, 64 assists) in 128 games and was named ECAC Player of the Year after the 2014–15 season.

In his junior year, Vesey's outstanding play was rewarded with a top-ten nomination for the Hobey Baker Award. On April 2, 2015, Vesey was named to the Hobey Hat Trick, the 3 finalists for the award, along with University of North Dakota's Zane McIntyre and Boston University's Jack Eichel, with Eichel going on to win the award. In 2016, Vesey once again qualified for the Hobey Hat Trick, along with Michigan Wolverine's Kyle Connor and Boston College's Thatcher Demko, this time going on to win the Hobey Baker Award on April 8, 2016.

Professional
Vesey was selected by the Nashville Predators in the 3rd round with the 66th overall selection of the 2012 NHL Entry Draft. Vesey was good enough for Nashville general manager David Poile to guarantee the senior a roster spot for the end of the 2015–16 regular season and playoffs. But Vesey informed the Predators he was not interested in signing. Vesey wanted to choose his destination, which any collegian can do four years out from when they are drafted.

Vesey's decision came as a blow to the Predators' organization. However, it was also within the bounds of the NHL's Collective Bargaining Agreement, which gives teams four years to sign college draftees and thus allows for the drafted player to move to free agency shortly after his senior year. On March 30, 2016, almost five months before he was officially set to become a free agent, it was reported that Vesey would sign with his hometown team, the Boston Bruins.  However, these reports did not end up being true.

On June 20, 2016, the Buffalo Sabres acquired Vesey's rights from the Predators in exchange for a third-round pick in the 2016 NHL Entry Draft. The deal was made in order to give the Sabres an extra few weeks of exclusive negotiating rights with Vesey before he became a free agent. Despite this, Vesey's agent informed ESPN that he had still intended to become a free agent. While discussions with the Sabres continued, a deal was not struck and in accordance with the NHL CBA, Vesey became an unrestricted free agent on August 16.

In the two days following his free agency, Vesey met with seven NHL teams. Five more teams requested to meet with Vesey, but were denied.

New York Rangers (2016–2019)
On August 20, 2016, Vesey signed with the New York Rangers. After attending the training camp, Vesey received the Lars-Erik Sjöberg Award, which is given to the best Rangers' rookie in the camp. On October 17, 2016, Vesey scored his first NHL goal in a 7–4 win over the San Jose Sharks.

On November 8, 2017, in a game against the Boston Bruins, Vesey scored 2 goals in 29 seconds. This was the quickest number of goals scored by a Rangers player since Jaromír Jágr did so in 26 seconds in 2006. The Rangers eventually won the game 4–2. On March 12, 2018, Vesey recorded his first career NHL hat trick in a game against the Carolina Hurricanes, which the Rangers won 6–3.

Buffalo Sabres (2019–2020)
On July 1, 2019, the Sabres again acquired Vesey in exchange for another third-round draft selection through a trade with the Rangers. This marks the first time in professional sports that a player was traded to the same team with the same compensation twice. In the 2019–20 season, Vesey was unable to add the offensive punch expected for the Sabres, posting a career low 9 goals and 20 points in 64 games, before the remainder of the regular season was cancelled due to the COVID-19 pandemic.

Toronto Maple Leafs and Vancouver Canucks (2020–2021)
As a free agent from the Sabres, Vesey was signed to a one-year, $900,000 contract by the Toronto Maple Leafs on October 11, 2020. In the pandemic-delayed 2020–21 season, Vesey initially appeared for the Maple Leafs on the second line with John Tavares and William Nylander before shifting into in a bottom-six forward role, contributing with 5 goals and 7 points through 30 games.

On March 17, 2021, Vesey was claimed off waivers from Toronto by the Vancouver Canucks, marking his fourth NHL club in three seasons. Vesey made 20 regular season appearances with the Canucks, collecting 3 assists, as the team missed out on the playoffs.

New Jersey Devils (2021–2022)
As a free agent from the Canucks, on September 14, 2021, Vesey was signed to a professional tryout contract (PTO) by the New Jersey Devils. On October 10, 2021, Vesey signed a one-year, $800,000 contract by the Devils, which marked his fifth NHL club in four seasons. Vesey played 68 games with the Devils, with eight goals.

Return to Rangers (2022–present)
After going unsigned in free agency, Vesey agreed to terms with the Rangers on September 2, 2022. He signed a tryout contract, with the Rangers intending to use him as a defensive forward on their fourth line. On October 9, the Rangers signed Vesey to a one-year contract. On January 4, 2023, he signed a contract extension to stay with the Rangers for another two years.

International play

Vesey won a gold medal while playing for the U.S. national junior team at the 2013 World Junior Ice Hockey Championship and took home a bronze medal as part of senior team at the 2015 IIHF World Championship.

Personal life
His father, Jim Vesey, was drafted by the St. Louis Blues in the eighth round of the 1984 NHL Entry Draft, going on to play 15 games in the National Hockey League; he works as a scout for the Toronto Maple Leafs.

Jimmy's younger brother Nolan was drafted by the Toronto Maple Leafs in the 2014 NHL Entry Draft. He was traded in June 2018 to the Edmonton Oilers and signed an entry-level contract with them.

Growing up, Vesey was friends with 2012 NHL Entry Draft pick Matt Grzelcyk. The two first met when they were around the age of six, playing hockey together for a team named the Middlesex Islanders. The Islanders were coached by Vesey's father. They similarly both attended the Belmont Hill School in Belmont, Massachusetts, and played hockey together there.

Career statistics

Regular season and playoffs

International

Awards and honors

Notes

References

External links
 

1993 births
Living people
American men's ice hockey left wingers
Buffalo Sabres players
Harvard Crimson men's ice hockey players
Hobey Baker Award winners
Ice hockey players from Massachusetts
Nashville Predators draft picks
New Jersey Devils players
New York Rangers players
People from North Reading, Massachusetts
Sportspeople from Middlesex County, Massachusetts
Toronto Maple Leafs players
Vancouver Canucks players
AHCA Division I men's ice hockey All-Americans